The Spanish basketball champions are the winners of the main basketball competition in Spain, which since 1983–84 is the Liga ACB. The league is contested on a round robin basis and the championship awarded to the team that is top of the league at the end of the season. The Liga Nacional, first established in 1957, originally contained six teams. Before the league, the Copa del Rey—a regionalised cup competition—was effectively the national championship. Nowadays, Liga ACB is contested by 18 teams; the two lowest-placed teams are relegated to the LEB Oro and replaced by the top two teams in that division. Of the founding teams in the league, only Joventut and Real Madrid have not been relegated.

Real Madrid is the most successful club with 36 titles, followed by Barcelona with 19 titles. The most recent club other than Real Madrid and Barcelona to win the league is Baskonia in the 2019–20 season. Real Madrid has won the Spanish version of the double the most times, having won the league and cup in the same year 18 times in its history, nine more than Barcelona's nine. Real Madrid has won the Triple Crown three times and Barcelona one time. The current champions are Real Madrid, who won the 2021–22 competition.

Champions

Liga Española de Baloncesto (1957–1983)

Liga ACB (1983–present)

Total titles won

By city

By Autonomous Community

All-time table 
The all-time table is an overall record of all match results of every team that has played since its inception in 1957. The table is accurate as of the end of the 2021–22 season.

League or status at 2021–22 season:

Clubs in international competitions

Notes

References

External links 
All editions 
Champions rosters 
Liga Nacional top scorers 
Players with more titles 
Coaches with more titles 

Champions
Champions
Champions